Jeff Nichols (born December 7, 1978) is an American film director and screenwriter from Little Rock, Arkansas. He studied filmmaking at the University of North Carolina School of the Arts. Nichols is most known for his films Take Shelter (2011), Mud (2012), and Loving (2016), which have been critically acclaimed. He is also known for his longstanding collaboration with actor Michael Shannon, who has appeared in all of his feature films to date.

Career
Nichols studied filmmaking at the University of North Carolina School of the Arts. He wrote his first screenplay, Shotgun Stories, with actor Michael Shannon in mind to play the lead, and contacted the actor through a former teacher. The film was shot on a budget of only $250,000, and released in 2007.

Nichols moved into independent productions with 2011's Take Shelter, also starring Shannon, and 2012's Mud, starring Matthew McConaughey, which competed for the Palme d'Or at the 2012 Cannes Film Festival. In 2012, Nichols acted as President of the Jury of the 7th Rome Film Festival.

His 2016 sci-fi drama film Midnight Special competed for the Golden Bear at the 66th Berlin International Film Festival. The same year, he directed the drama Loving, a film about the landmark U.S. civil rights court case Loving v. Virginia, which was nominated for numerous awards, including a Golden Globe nomination for lead actor Joel Edgerton and Academy Award and Golden Globe nominations for lead actress Ruth Negga.

Five of Nichols' films have featured Shannon: Shotgun Stories, Take Shelter, Midnight Special, Mud, Loving.

In 2018 he directed the short film, “Long Way Back Home", inspired by a song of the same name that was written by his brother Ben and released by the country punk band, Lucero. It stars Michael Shannon, who searches the streets and backroads of Memphis for his two younger brothers, played by Garrett Hedlund and Scoot McNairy.

Nichols is currently writing and directing Yankee Comandante, adapted from David Grann's New Yorker article about Che Guevara and William Alexander Morgan.  Adam Driver will star in the film.  Production is scheduled to start in 2021. In November 2020, it was announced he would be directing and writing the screenplay for A Quiet Place: Day One, which is set to release in 2023. In May 2021, it was announced he finished the script for the film. However, he departed the project in October 2021, to focus on a new science fiction project also in development at Paramount Pictures.

In August 2022, it was announced that Nichols would be directing The Bikeriders, a film inspired by the Danny Lyon book of the same name. It is to be produced by Sarah Green and Brian Kavanaugh-Jones, through Tri-State, their company shared with Nichols.  Fred Berger will be executive producer. The ensemble cast will feature Tom Hardy, Michael Shannon, Austin Butler, Jodie Comer, Boyd Holbrook, Damon Herriman, Toby Wallace, Emory Cohen, Beau Knapp, Karl Glusman, Happy Anderson, and Mike Faist.

Personal life
Nichols was born in Little Rock, Arkansas and attended Little Rock Central High School. He is the brother of Lucero guitarist and singer Ben Nichols. He is influenced by Mark Twain.

Filmography

Film

Short films

Writing/producing

Executive producer only

Podcast

See also
James Marsh

References

External links
 

1978 births
Living people
American people of English descent
American film producers
American male screenwriters
Film directors from Arkansas
University of North Carolina School of the Arts alumni
Writers from Little Rock, Arkansas
Screenwriters from Arkansas